Olga Ivanova may refer to:

 Olga Yakovlevna Ivanova (born 1945), Russian diplomat and ambassador
 Olga Ivanova (athlete) (born 1979), Russian shot putter
 Olga Ivanova (politician) (born 1984), Estonian politician
 Olga Ivanova (rower), Russian gold medal winner at the 1971 European Rowing Championships
 Olga Ivanova (taekwondo) (born 1993), Russian taekwondo practitioner
 Olga Ivanova (tennis) (born 1977), Russian tennis player